Yousefi is a Persian patronymic surname, meaning "son of Joseph".  It is rare as a given name.

People 
 Amir Hossein Yousefi, Iranian footballer
 Masoud Yousefi, Computer Eng. in the California, USA
 Ershad Yousefi, Iranian footballer
 Mohsen Yousefi (footballer, born 1984), Iranian footballer
 Mohsen Yousefi (footballer, born 1954), Iranian footballer
 Yousefi Eshkevari, Iranian cleric

Persian-language surnames
Patronymic surnames
Surnames from given names